Lorne William Bell Carr (July 2, 1910 — June 9, 2007) was a Canadian professional ice hockey player who played in the National Hockey League with the New York Rangers, New York Americans, and Toronto Maple Leafs between 1933 and 1946.

Profession career
Carr began his career in 1930 with the Vancouver Lions of the Pacific Coast Hockey League. He next played for the Buffalo Bisons of the International Hockey League. In 1934 Carr signed with the New York Rangers. After one season with the Rangers, Carr signed with the rival New York Americans, with whom he played for the following seven seasons.

In 1941, Carr was traded to the Toronto Maple Leafs for Red Heron, Nick Knott, Gus Marker and cash. It was with Toronto that he enjoyed his most success as a player. In 1942 he won his first Stanley Cup Championship, when his team, down three games to zero, won four straight against the Detroit Red Wings in the Stanley Cup Final, winning the championship. Carr played another four seasons with the Maple Leafs, winning a second Stanley Cup Championship in 1945. He ended his playing career after the 1946 season.

Post-playing career
Following his retirement, Carr moved to Calgary, Alberta and opened the Amylorne Motel. The motel featured an 18-hole golf course and a driving range. He also co-owned a Calgary poolroom with Calgary native and former New York American Fred Hergerts.

Career statistics

Regular season and playoffs

External links
 
Lorne Carr's Day With the Stanley Cup

1910 births
2007 deaths
Buffalo Bisons (IHL) players
Canadian ice hockey right wingers
Ice hockey people from Saskatchewan
New York Rangers players
New York Americans players
Philadelphia Arrows players
Stanley Cup champions
Syracuse Stars (IHL) players
Toronto Maple Leafs players
Vancouver Lions players